Limberger may refer to:

 A synonym for the grape variety Blaufränkisch

People with the surname
Carl Limberger (born 1964), Australian tennis player
Thomas Limberger (born 1967), German businessman

See also
 Limburger cheese